Philip Hazel is a computer programmer best known for writing the Exim mail transport agent in 1995 and the PCRE regular expression library in 1997. He was employed by the University of Cambridge Computing Service until he retired at the end of September 2007. In 2009 Hazel wrote an autobiographical memoir about his computing career which he updated in 2017.

Hazel is also known for his typesetting software, in particular "Philip's Music Writer", as well as programs to turn a simple markup into a subset of DocBook XML for use in the Exim manual, and to produce PostScript from this XML.

Published works

References

External links
Philip Hazel's personal website

English computer programmers
Free software programmers
Living people
Year of birth missing (living people)
Alumni of St John's College, Cambridge